This is a list of notable hamburgers. A hamburger consists of a cooked patty of ground meat usually placed between two slices of a bread roll. Hamburgers are often served with lettuce, bacon, tomato, onion, pickles, cheese, and condiments such as mustard, mayonnaise, ketchup, and relish. There are many types of regional hamburgers with significant variations.


Hamburgers

See also

 History of the hamburger
 History of the hamburger in the United States
 Hot dog variations
 List of beef dishes
 List of hamburger restaurants
 List of sandwiches
 List of steak dishes

References

External links
 

 List
Lists of foods
Lists of foods by type